Myim Rose was a singer/songwriter/actress from Washington Heights, Manhattan. She is best known for vocals on the 1994 Moby song "Feeling so Real" and playing Layla in the 1992 film Unlawful Entry. She was a singer/songwriter who fronted her own rock band in New York City. In November 2006, Myim died after a 4-year battle with cancer. Myim married actor Brian Gant in 2001. He was with her at the time of her death.

Filmography

External links
The Myim Rose Foundation:
http://www.myimrosefoundation.org/
http://www.discogs.com/artist/Myim+Rose
https://www.youtube.com/watch?v=mIIurF0neQg

American women singers
2006 deaths
Year of birth missing
21st-century American women